Zix Corporation (ZixCorp) was a security technology company that provides email encryption services, email data loss prevention (DLP), and mobile applications designed to address bring your own device (BYOD) corporate technology trend. Before being acquired by OpenText, Zix was headquartered in Dallas, Texas, and served customers that include divisions of the U.S. Treasury, federal financial regulators, health insurance providers, and hospitals, and financial companies. As of December 2011, the company has served over thirty Blue Cross Blue Shield organizations, 1,200 hospitals, 1,600 banks, credit unions, and associations. Federal Financial Institutions Examination Council (FFIEC) regulators are also the customers of the company. CIPROMS signed a three-year renewal for the company in 2014.

The company generated money based on a software-as-a-service (SaaS) strategy and charge annual fees from its customers. ZixCorp was founded in 1983. The company operated its service supported by ZixData Center, a data center storing transaction processing data. In 2002, the company changed its name from Zixlt Corporation to Zix Corporation.

In 2017, Zix acquired Greenview Data for $6.5 million. In 2019, it acquired AppRiver, a provider of cloud-based cybersecurity solutions, for $275 million.

Products and services
The court case between Apple and the FBI, along with a slew of major security breaches from Experian to Ashley Madison, has popularized encryption as a way to protect messages, yet email encryption is also reported to be difficult to use for people unfamiliar with the encryption process. To simplify the encryption process, Zix email encryption uses an e-mail encryption directory called ZixDirectory that lists other email addresses protected by the encryption service to maintain a community of users who can send and receive e-mails to each other without having to use encryption keys.

Customers install a ZixGateway application and configure compliance and security policy requirements, then the application monitors outbound emails to determine whether messages should be encrypted, and then works in conjunction with secure servers in a SaaS (software-as-a-service) environment to encrypt outgoing communications and securely decrypt inbound messages from other users listed within the ZixDirectory. The email encryption service, ZixDirectory, is an international community with 30 million members.

In 2014, Google announced a partnership with ZixCorp to introduce a new commercial product for Google Apps accounts dubbed Google Apps Message Encryption (GAME), based on Zix Email Encryption. For a per-user subscription, the service allows Google Apps admins to configure encryption settings and routes from the Google Apps dashboard.

Several markets and policies have emerged to address BYOD security concerns, including mobile device management (MDM), containerization and app virtualization.

In 2013, ZixCorp introduced ZixOne, a mobile email application for businesses coping with the BYOD trend of employees using personal devices for work, by protecting corporate data in email, while allowing employees to maintain privacy and control of their personal devices. The service provides access to corporate email in the cloud-based service, allowing employees to view messages and attachments without storing any data on the device. This approach differs mobile device management (MDM), which provides organizations with the ability to control applications and content on the device. Research has revealed controversy around MDM related to employee privacy and usability issues that lead to resistance in some organizations. Corporate liability issues have also emerged when businesses use MDM to wipe devices after employees leave the organization.

To help organizations that must comply with industry and federal regulations restricting content that can be sent via email, the company introduced ZixDLP to quarantine emails violating policies, and ZixDLP Insight to detect and analyze email policy violations without impeding communications or business workflows. The data protection service is offered as an add-on solution for customers who use ZixGateway, a policy-based email encryption service that automatically scans and encrypts outbound emails containing sensitive information.

On November 8, 2021, Zix announced would be acquired by OpenText for $860 million. OpenText purchased all outstanding stocks, delisting Zix from Nasdaq, as well as acquiring all its outstanding cash and debt.

References

External links 
 

Software companies established in 1988
Companies formerly listed on the Nasdaq
Companies based in Dallas
2021 mergers and acquisitions